Liberty Township is one of nine townships in Wells County, Indiana, United States. As of the 2010 census, its population was 1,086 and it contained 438 housing units.

Geography

Cities, towns, villages
 Poneto (west three-quarters)

Unincorporated towns
 Liberty Center at 
 Wellsburg at 
(This list is based on USGS data and may include former settlements.)

Adjacent townships
 Rockcreek Township (north)
 Lancaster Township (northeast)
 Harrison Township (east)
 Nottingham Township (southeast)
 Chester Township (south)
 Jackson Township (southwest)
 Salamonie Township, Huntington County (west)
 Rock Creek Township, Huntington County (northwest)

Cemeteries
The township contains these two cemeteries: McFarren and Mossburg.

School districts
 Southern Wells Community Schools

Political districts
 Indiana's 6th congressional district
 State House District 82
 State Senate District 19

References
 United States Census Bureau 2007 TIGER/Line Shapefiles
 United States Board on Geographic Names (GNIS)
 IndianaMap

External links
 Indiana Township Association
 United Township Association of Indiana

Townships in Wells County, Indiana
Townships in Indiana